William Anderson (born March 3, 1929) is a former American football running back who played two seasons with the Chicago Bears of the National Football League (NFL). He was drafted by the Chicago Bears with the sixth pick of the first round of the 1953 NFL Draft.  He played college football at Compton Community College and attended Susan Miller Dorsey High School in Los Angeles, California.

References

External links
Just Sports Stats
Fanbase profile

Living people
1929 births
American football halfbacks
American football defensive backs
Compton Tartars football players
Chicago Bears players
Players of American football from Los Angeles
Susan Miller Dorsey High School alumni